The Kenya Davis Cup team represents Kenya in Davis Cup tennis competition and are governed by the Kenya Lawn Tennis Association.

Kenya currently compete in Africa Zone Group III.

History
Kenya competed in its first Davis Cup in 1975.  Their best result was reaching the Euro/African Zone semifinals in 1992, one match shy of the World Group Play-offs.

Current team (2022) 

 Kael Shalin Shah
 Albert Njogu
 Keean Shah
 Derick Ominde

See also
Davis Cup
Kenya Fed Cup team

External links

Davis Cup teams
Davis Cup
Davis Cup
1975 establishments in Kenya
Sports clubs established in 1975